The Wana Brigade was an Infantry formation of the Indian Army during World War II. It was formed in February 1930, for service on the North West Frontier. During World War 2 it was normal practice for newly formed battalions to be posted to the North West Frontier for service before being sent to Africa, Burma or Italy.

Formation
These units served in the brigade during World War II
1/18th Royal Garhwal Rifles
2/8th Gurkha Rifles
2/3rd Gurkha Rifles
2/2nd Punjab Regiment
3/8th Punjab Regiment
2/13th Frontier Force Rifles
2nd Jammu and Kashmir Rifles
1/3rd Gurkha Rifles
4/14th Punjab Regiment
3/6th Rajputana Rifles
6/12th Frontier Force Regiment
4/2nd Gurkha Rifles
4/7th Gurkha Rifles
14/6th Rajputana Rifles
5/15th Punjab Regiment
16/13th Frontier Force Rifles
15/6th Rajputana Rifles
Shamsher Dal Regiment, Nepal
9th Jammu and Kashmir Infantry
7/17th Dogra Regiment
9th Field Company, Indian Engineers
Sirmoor Field Company, Indian States Forces
96th Field Company IE	
Faridkot Field Company,  ISF

See also

 List of Indian Army Brigades in World War II

References

British Indian Army brigades